Derwent Valley Council is a local government body situated in southern-central Tasmania, west of Hobart. Derwent Valley is classified as a rural local government area and has a population of 10,290, it includes the localities of Bushy Park, Maydena and Strathgordon, with New Norfolk the major, principal town.

History and attributes
Derwent Valley was established on 2 April 1994, it was previously known as the New Norfolk Municipal Council. Derwent Valley is classified as rural, agricultural and large (RAL) under the Australian Classification of Local Governments.

The Tarn Shelf within Mount Field National Park is located within the region and is an area of significant botanic interest. One unique plant that is only found in this area is a cross between the King Billy and Huon Pine.

Current council
The council logo depicts an oast house (a kiln for drying hops), trees and a roll of paper which are representative of major industries in the municipality.

The current Council was elected in 2022:

Localities

  (part)
  (part)
  (part)
 
  (part)
  (part)
 
  (part)
 
  (part)
 
  (part)
  (part)
 
 
 
 
 
  (part)
 
 
 
 
  (part)
 
  (part)
 
 
 
 
 
 
 
 
  (part)
 Westerway (part)

Not in above list
 Southwest (part)

See also
List of local government areas of Tasmania

References

External links
Derwent Valley Council official website
Local Government Association Tasmania
Tasmanian Electoral Commission - local government

 
Local government areas of Tasmania
South West Tasmania